The 2005–06 Tampa Bay Lightning season was the 14th National Hockey League season in Tampa, Florida.  Due to the cancellation of the 2004–05 season, the Lightning entered the season as defending Stanley Cup champions, which they won in 2003–04.

Regular season

Final standings

Playoffs
The Tampa Bay Lightning ended the 2005–06 regular season as the Eastern Conference's eighth seed.

Schedule and results

Regular season

|- align="center" bgcolor="#CCFFCC" 
|1||W||October 5, 2005||5–2 || align="left"|  Carolina Hurricanes (2005–06) ||1–0–0 || 
|- align="center" bgcolor="#FFBBBB"
|2||L||October 7, 2005||0–2 || align="left"|  Florida Panthers (2005–06) ||1–1–0 || 
|- align="center" bgcolor="#CCFFCC" 
|3||W||October 8, 2005||2–1 || align="left"|  Florida Panthers (2005–06) ||2–1–0 || 
|- align="center" bgcolor="#FFBBBB"
|4||L||October 10, 2005||2–4 || align="left"|  Boston Bruins (2005–06) ||2–2–0 || 
|- align="center"
|5||L||October 13, 2005||3–4 SO|| align="left"|  Buffalo Sabres (2005–06) ||2–2–1 || 
|- align="center" bgcolor="#CCFFCC" 
|6||W||October 15, 2005||3–1 || align="left"| @ Pittsburgh Penguins (2005–06) ||3–2–1 || 
|- align="center" 
|7||L||October 16, 2005||2–3 SO|| align="left"| @ Washington Capitals (2005–06) ||3–2–2 || 
|- align="center" bgcolor="#CCFFCC" 
|8||W||October 20, 2005||6–0 || align="left"| @ Atlanta Thrashers (2005–06) ||4–2–2 || 
|- align="center" bgcolor="#FFBBBB"
|9||L||October 21, 2005||1–4 || align="left"|  Ottawa Senators (2005–06) ||4–3–2 || 
|- align="center" bgcolor="#CCFFCC" 
|10||W||October 26, 2005||6–3 || align="left"| @ New Jersey Devils (2005–06) ||5–3–2 || 
|- align="center" bgcolor="#CCFFCC" 
|11||W||October 28, 2005||4–2 || align="left"|  Washington Capitals (2005–06) ||6–3–2 || 
|- align="center" bgcolor="#CCFFCC" 
|12||W||October 29, 2005||3–2 || align="left"| @ Atlanta Thrashers (2005–06) ||7–3–2 || 
|-

|- align="center" bgcolor="#FFBBBB"
|13||L||November 1, 2005||4–6 || align="left"|  Atlanta Thrashers (2005–06) ||7–4–2 || 
|- align="center" bgcolor="#FFBBBB"
|14||L||November 3, 2005||2–4 || align="left"| @ Ottawa Senators (2005–06) ||7–5–2 || 
|- align="center" bgcolor="#FFBBBB"
|15||L||November 5, 2005||3–5 || align="left"| @ Toronto Maple Leafs (2005–06) ||7–6–2 || 
|- align="center" bgcolor="#FFBBBB"
|16||L||November 8, 2005||2–3 || align="left"| @ Montreal Canadiens (2005–06) ||7–7–2 || 
|- align="center" bgcolor="#FFBBBB"
|17||L||November 10, 2005||2–5 || align="left"|  New York Rangers (2005–06) ||7–8–2 || 
|- align="center" bgcolor="#FFBBBB"
|18||L||November 11, 2005||2–5 || align="left"| @ Atlanta Thrashers (2005–06) ||7–9–2 || 
|- align="center" bgcolor="#CCFFCC" 
|19||W||November 14, 2005||5–2 || align="left"|  Philadelphia Flyers (2005–06) ||8–9–2 || 
|- align="center" 
|20||L||November 15, 2005||3–4 SO|| align="left"| @ Washington Capitals (2005–06) ||8–9–3 || 
|- align="center" bgcolor="#CCFFCC" 
|21||W||November 17, 2005||3–2 || align="left"|  New York Islanders (2005–06) ||9–9–3 || 
|- align="center" bgcolor="#CCFFCC" 
|22||W||November 20, 2005||5–2 || align="left"| @ Carolina Hurricanes (2005–06) ||10–9–3 || 
|- align="center" bgcolor="#CCFFCC" 
|23||W||November 22, 2005||4–2 || align="left"| @ Philadelphia Flyers (2005–06) ||11–9–3 || 
|- align="center" bgcolor="#CCFFCC" 
|24||W||November 23, 2005||4–3 SO|| align="left"| @ Washington Capitals (2005–06) ||12–9–3 || 
|- align="center" bgcolor="#FFBBBB"
|25||L||November 25, 2005||2–8 || align="left"|  New Jersey Devils (2005–06) ||12–10–3 || 
|- align="center" bgcolor="#CCFFCC" 
|26||W||November 27, 2005||4–1 || align="left"|  Pittsburgh Penguins (2005–06) ||13–10–3 || 
|- align="center" bgcolor="#CCFFCC" 
|27||W||November 30, 2005||2–1 || align="left"|  Toronto Maple Leafs (2005–06) ||14–10–3 || 
|-

|- align="center" bgcolor="#CCFFCC" 
|28||W||December 2, 2005||3–2 SO|| align="left"|  Chicago Blackhawks (2005–06) ||15–10–3 || 
|- align="center" bgcolor="#CCFFCC" 
|29||W||December 8, 2005||5–4 || align="left"|  St. Louis Blues (2005–06) ||16–10–3 || 
|- align="center" bgcolor="#CCFFCC" 
|30||W||December 10, 2005||4–3 || align="left"|  Nashville Predators (2005–06) ||17–10–3 || 
|- align="center" bgcolor="#FFBBBB"
|31||L||December 14, 2005||2–4 || align="left"| @ Mighty Ducks of Anaheim (2005–06) ||17–11–3 || 
|- align="center" bgcolor="#CCFFCC" 
|32||W||December 15, 2005||3–1 || align="left"| @ Phoenix Coyotes (2005–06) ||18–11–3 || 
|- align="center" bgcolor="#FFBBBB"
|33||L||December 17, 2005||3–6 || align="left"|  Detroit Red Wings (2005–06) ||18–12–3 || 
|- align="center" bgcolor="#FFBBBB"
|34||L||December 20, 2005||4–6 || align="left"| @ Carolina Hurricanes (2005–06) ||18–13–3 || 
|- align="center" bgcolor="#FFBBBB"
|35||L||December 22, 2005||2–4 || align="left"| @ New York Rangers (2005–06) ||18–14–3 || 
|- align="center" bgcolor="#FFBBBB"
|36||L||December 23, 2005||1–4 || align="left"|  Buffalo Sabres (2005–06) ||18–15–3 || 
|- align="center" bgcolor="#CCFFCC" 
|37||W||December 26, 2005||5–4 OT|| align="left"|  Carolina Hurricanes (2005–06) ||19–15–3 || 
|- align="center" bgcolor="#FFBBBB"
|38||L||December 28, 2005||3–4 || align="left"|  Montreal Canadiens (2005–06) ||19–16–3 || 
|- align="center" bgcolor="#FFBBBB"
|39||L||December 30, 2005||1–2 || align="left"|  Boston Bruins (2005–06) ||19–17–3 || 
|-

|- align="center" bgcolor="#CCFFCC" 
|40||W||January 2, 2006||2–1 || align="left"| @ New York Islanders (2005–06) ||20–17–3 || 
|- align="center" bgcolor="#CCFFCC" 
|41||W||January 3, 2006||1–0 OT|| align="left"| @ New York Rangers (2005–06) ||21–17–3 || 
|- align="center" bgcolor="#FFBBBB"
|42||L||January 5, 2006||1–3 || align="left"| @ Buffalo Sabres (2005–06) ||21–18–3 || 
|- align="center" bgcolor="#FFBBBB"
|43||L||January 7, 2006||3–6 || align="left"| @ Boston Bruins (2005–06) ||21–19–3 || 
|- align="center" bgcolor="#CCFFCC" 
|44||W||January 13, 2006||4–2 || align="left"|  Columbus Blue Jackets (2005–06) ||22–19–3 || 
|- align="center" bgcolor="#FFBBBB"
|45||L||January 16, 2006||1–3 || align="left"| @ San Jose Sharks (2005–06) ||22–20–3 || 
|- align="center" bgcolor="#CCFFCC" 
|46||W||January 17, 2006||4–1 || align="left"| @ Los Angeles Kings (2005–06) ||23–20–3 || 
|- align="center" bgcolor="#CCFFCC" 
|47||W||January 20, 2006||6–3 || align="left"| @ Dallas Stars (2005–06) ||24–20–3 || 
|- align="center" bgcolor="#CCFFCC" 
|48||W||January 21, 2006||2–0 || align="left"| @ Atlanta Thrashers (2005–06) ||25–20–3 || 
|- align="center" 
|49||L||January 24, 2006||2–3 OT|| align="left"|  Florida Panthers (2005–06) ||25–20–4 || 
|- align="center" bgcolor="#CCFFCC" 
|50||W||January 26, 2006||1–0 OT|| align="left"|  New Jersey Devils (2005–06) ||26–20–4 || 
|- align="center" bgcolor="#CCFFCC" 
|51||W||January 28, 2006||6–0 || align="left"| @ Philadelphia Flyers (2005–06) ||27–20–4 || 
|- align="center" bgcolor="#FFBBBB"
|52||L||January 29, 2006||1–2 || align="left"| @ Washington Capitals (2005–06) ||27–21–4 || 
|- align="center" bgcolor="#CCFFCC" 
|53||W||January 31, 2006||3–2 SO|| align="left"|  Toronto Maple Leafs (2005–06) ||28–21–4 || 
|-

|- align="center" bgcolor="#CCFFCC" 
|54||W||February 4, 2006||5–0 || align="left"|  Washington Capitals (2005–06) ||29–21–4 || 
|- align="center" bgcolor="#CCFFCC" 
|55||W||February 6, 2006||3–2 OT|| align="left"| @ New York Islanders (2005–06) ||30–21–4 || 
|- align="center" bgcolor="#FFBBBB"
|56||L||February 7, 2006||4–7 || align="left"| @ New Jersey Devils (2005–06) ||30–22–4 || 
|- align="center" bgcolor="#CCFFCC" 
|57||W||February 9, 2006||5–3 || align="left"|  Carolina Hurricanes (2005–06) ||31–22–4 || 
|- align="center" bgcolor="#CCFFCC" 
|58||W||February 11, 2006||6–5 || align="left"| @ Boston Bruins (2005–06) ||32–22–4 || 
|- align="center" bgcolor="#FFBBBB"
|59||L||February 28, 2006||2–8 || align="left"|  Florida Panthers (2005–06) ||32–23–4 || 
|-

|- align="center" bgcolor="#FFBBBB"
|60||L||March 4, 2006||2–6 || align="left"|  Montreal Canadiens (2005–06) ||32–24–4 || 
|- align="center" bgcolor="#FFBBBB"
|61||L||March 6, 2006||0–4 || align="left"|  Ottawa Senators (2005–06) ||32–25–4 || 
|- align="center" bgcolor="#CCFFCC" 
|62||W||March 7, 2006||5–4 SO|| align="left"| @ Pittsburgh Penguins (2005–06) ||33–25–4 || 
|- align="center" bgcolor="#FFBBBB"
|63||L||March 9, 2006||5–8 || align="left"| @ Buffalo Sabres (2005–06) ||33–26–4 || 
|- align="center" bgcolor="#FFBBBB"
|64||L||March 11, 2006||1–5 || align="left"| @ Toronto Maple Leafs (2005–06) ||33–27–4 || 
|- align="center" bgcolor="#CCFFCC" 
|65||W||March 13, 2006||2–1 || align="left"| @ Montreal Canadiens (2005–06) ||34–27–4 || 
|- align="center" bgcolor="#FFBBBB"
|66||L||March 14, 2006||3–4 || align="left"| @ Ottawa Senators (2005–06) ||34–28–4 || 
|- align="center" bgcolor="#CCFFCC" 
|67||W||March 17, 2006||6–3 || align="left"|  Philadelphia Flyers (2005–06) ||35–28–4 || 
|- align="center" bgcolor="#CCFFCC" 
|68||W||March 19, 2006||5–2 || align="left"|  New York Islanders (2005–06) ||36–28–4 || 
|- align="center" 
|69||L||March 20, 2006||5–6 OT|| align="left"| @ Florida Panthers (2005–06) ||36–28–5 || 
|- align="center" bgcolor="#CCFFCC" 
|70||W||March 23, 2006||4–3 OT|| align="left"|  Washington Capitals (2005–06) ||37–28–5 || 
|- align="center" bgcolor="#CCFFCC" 
|71||W||March 25, 2006||4–3 SO|| align="left"|  New York Rangers (2005–06) ||38–28–5 || 
|- align="center" bgcolor="#FFBBBB"
|72||L||March 27, 2006||1–2 || align="left"| @ Carolina Hurricanes (2005–06) ||38–29–5 || 
|- align="center" bgcolor="#CCFFCC" 
|73||W||March 30, 2006||4–3 || align="left"|  Atlanta Thrashers (2005–06) ||39–29–5 || 
|-

|- align="center" bgcolor="#FFBBBB"
|74||L||April 1, 2006||2–4 || align="left"| @ Florida Panthers (2005–06) ||39–30–5 || 
|- align="center" bgcolor="#CCFFCC" 
|75||W||April 3, 2006||4–1 || align="left"|  Florida Panthers (2005–06) ||40–30–5 || 
|- align="center" bgcolor="#CCFFCC" 
|76||W||April 6, 2006||3–2 SO|| align="left"|  Atlanta Thrashers (2005–06) ||41–30–5 || 
|- align="center" bgcolor="#CCFFCC" 
|77||W||April 8, 2006||1–0 || align="left"|  Pittsburgh Penguins (2005–06) ||42–30–5 || 
|- align="center" bgcolor="#FFBBBB"
|78||L||April 9, 2006||3–6 || align="left"| @ Florida Panthers (2005–06) ||42–31–5 || 
|- align="center" bgcolor="#FFBBBB"
|79||L||April 11, 2006||2–6 || align="left"|  Atlanta Thrashers (2005–06) ||42–32–5 || 
|- align="center" 
|80||L||April 14, 2006||4–5 SO|| align="left"| @ Carolina Hurricanes (2005–06) ||42–32–6 || 
|- align="center" bgcolor="#CCFFCC" 
|81||W||April 15, 2006||3–2 OT|| align="left"|  Carolina Hurricanes (2005–06) ||43–32–6 || 
|- align="center" bgcolor="#FFBBBB"
|82||L||April 18, 2006||1–4 || align="left"|  Washington Capitals (2005–06) ||43–33–6 || 
|-

|-
| Legend:

Playoffs

|- align="center" bgcolor="#ffbbbb"
| 1 || April 21, 2006 || Tampa Bay || 1–4 || Ottawa || 19,660 || Senators lead 1–0 || 
|- align="center" bgcolor="#bbffbb"
| 2 || April 23, 2006 || Tampa Bay || 4–3 || Ottawa || 19,745 || Series tied 1–1 || 
|- align="center" bgcolor="#ffbbbb"  
| 3 || April 25, 2006 || Ottawa || 8–4 || Tampa Bay || 20,815 || Senators lead 2–1 || 
|- align="center" bgcolor="#ffbbbb"
| 4 || April 27, 2006 || Ottawa || 5–2 || Tampa Bay || 20,682 || Senators lead 3–1 || 
|- align="center" bgcolor="#ffbbbb"
| 5 || April 29, 2006 || Tampa Bay || 2–3 || Ottawa || 20,004 || Senators win 4–1 || 
|-

|-
| Legend:

Player statistics

Scoring
 Position abbreviations: C = Center; D = Defense; G = Goaltender; LW = Left Wing; RW = Right Wing
  = Left team via a transaction (e.g., trade, waivers, release) during the season. Stats reflect time with the Lightning only.

Goaltending
  = Left team via a transaction (e.g., trade, waivers, release) during the season. Stats reflect time with the Lightning only.

Awards and honors

Milestones

Transactions
The Lightning were involved in the following transactions from February 17, 2005, the day after the 2004–05 NHL season was officially cancelled, through June 19, 2006, the day of the deciding game of the 2006 Stanley Cup Finals.

Trades

Players acquired

Players lost

Signings

Draft picks
Tampa's picks at the 2005 NHL Entry Draft in Ottawa, Ontario.

See also
2005–06 NHL season

Notes

References

Tam
Tam
Tampa Bay Lightning seasons
Tamp
Tamp